Joseph Moiseyevich Schillinger (Russian: Иосиф Моисеевич Шиллингер,  – 23 March 1943) was a composer, music theorist, and composition teacher who originated the Schillinger System of Musical Composition. He was born in Kharkov, in the Kharkov Governorate of the Russian Empire (present-day Ukraine) and died in New York City.

Life and career
The unprecedented migration of European knowledge and culture that swept from East to West during the first decades of the 20th century included figures such as Prokofiev and Rachmaninov, composers who were the product of the Russian system of music education. Schillinger came from this background, dedicated to creating professional musicians, having been a student at the St Petersburg Imperial Conservatory of Music. He communicated his musical knowledge in the form of a written theory, using mathematical expressions to describe art, architecture, design and music.

In New York, Schillinger flourished, becoming famous as an advisor to many leading U.S. musicians and concert music composers, including George Gershwin, Earle Brown, Benny Goodman, Glenn Miller, Oscar Levant, Tommy Dorsey and Henry Cowell.

Gershwin spent four years (1932–36) studying with Schillinger. During this period, he wrote Porgy and Bess and consulted Schillinger on it, particularly the orchestration. There has been some disagreement about the nature of Schillinger's influence on Gershwin. After the posthumous success of Porgy and Bess, Schillinger claimed he had a large and direct influence in overseeing its creation; Ira Gershwin completely denied that his brother had any such assistance for the work. A third account of Gershwin's musical relationship with Schillinger was written by Gershwin's close friend Vernon Duke, also a Schillinger student, in an article for The Musical Quarterly in 1947. Some of Gershwin's notebooks from his studies with Schillinger are at the Library of Congress.

In the field of electronic music, Schillinger collaborated with Léon Theremin, the inventor of the theremin. Schillinger wrote his First Airphonic Suite for Theremin, who played the instrument at the premiere in 1929 with the Cleveland Orchestra, conducted by Nikolai Sokoloff.

Schillinger applied his mathematical principles to various fields, as he believed that the same underlying mathematics governed all forms of art. His 658-page work The Mathematical Basis of the Arts (1943) lays out his ideas in extended detail. Schillinger also collaborated with the filmmaker Mary Ellen Bute, and published a new method of dance notation.

Schillinger taught at a number of institutions, including The New School, but his greatest success was his postal tuition courses, which later became The Schillinger System of Musical Composition, published posthumously by Lyle Dowling and Arnold Shaw.

Schillinger accredited a small group of students as qualified teachers of his system, and after his death, one of them, Lawrence Berk, founded a music school in Boston to continue its dissemination. Schillinger House opened in 1945 and later became the Berklee College of Music, where the system survived in the curriculum until the early 1970s.

There has been debate about how many teachers Schillinger certified. The numbers cited range from seven to twelve. To date, only seven certified teachers of the Schillinger System have been substantiated. Three certified teachers were Asher Zlotnik of Baltimore, Maryland (a student and personal friend of Dowling), Edwin Gerschefski, and Roland Wiggins.

References

Further reading
 Anderson, Ruth. Contemporary American composers. A Biographical Dictionary, 2nd edition, G. K. Hall, 1982, 
 Arden, Jeremy, "Keys to the Schillinger System, course A, Basic principles and foundations"; Rose Books 2006, 
 Arden. Jeremy, Keys to the Schillinger System, course B, Basic principles and foundations.; Rose Books 2008, 
 Arden, Jeremy, "Focussing the musical imagination: exploring in composition the ideas and techniques of Joseph Schillinger", Ph.D. thesis 1996, City University, London.
 Augustine, Daniel. "Four Theories of Music in the United States, 1900-1950: Cowell, Yasser, Partch, Schillinger,"  Ph.D. diss., University of Texas, 1979.
 Backus, John. "Pseudo-Science in Music," Journal of Music Theory 4 (1960): 221-232.
 Beyer, Richard. "George Gershwin's Variations on 'I Got Rhythm'," Musica 49/4 (July-Aug 1995): 233-238.
 Brodsky, Warren. "Joseph Schillinger (1895-1943): Music Science Promethean" American Music 21/1 (Spring, 2003): 45-73.
 Burk, James M. "Schillinger's Double Equal Temperament System." In The Psychology and Acoustics of Music: a Collection of Papers, ed. E. Asmus.  Lawrence, KS: [publisher], 1979.
 Burk, James M. "Joseph (Moiseyevich) Schillinger," in New Grove Dictionary of American Music, ed. By H. Wiley Hitchcock.  New York: Macmillan/Groves Dictionaries, 1986.
 Butterworth, Neil. A Dictionary of American Composers, Garland, 1984.
 Carter, Elliott. "The Schillinger Case: Fallacy of the Mechanistic Approach."  Modern Music 23 (1946): 228-230.
 Cowell, Henry and Sidney.  "The Schillinger Case: Charting the Musical Range," Modern Music 23/3 (1946): 226-8
 Cowell, Henry.  "Joseph Schillinger as Composer," Music News 39/3 (1947): 5-6
 Dowling, Lyle. A Brief Note on the Schillinger System.  New York: Allied Music, 1942.
 Duke, Vernon. "Gershwin, Schillinger, Dukelsky: Some Reminiscences," Musical Quarterly 33/1 (1947): 102-115
 Gilbert, Steven E. "Gershwin's Art of Counterpoint."  Musical Quarterly 70/4 (1984): 423-456.
 Gojowy, Detlef.  "Sowjetische Avantgardisten," Musik und Bildung 1/12 (Dec. 1969): 537-542.
 Heath, James. "Joseph Schillinger: Educator and Visionary," Jazz Research Papers (IAJE) 10 (1990): 126-131.
 Human, Alfred.  "Schillinger Challenges Genius," Musical Digest 29/8 (April, 1947): 12-14, 16.
 Isenberg, Arnold. "Analytical Philosophy and The Study of Art," Journal of Aesthetics and Art Criticism 46 (1987)
 Levinson, Ilya. "What the Triangles Have Told Me: Manifestations of the Schillinger System of Musical Composition in George Gershwin's Porgy and Bess," Ph.D. diss., University of Chicago, 1997.
 Lyman, Darryl. Great Jews in Music, J. D. Publishers, 1986.
 Nauert, Paul.  "Theory and Practice in Porgy and Bess: the Gershwin-Schillinger Connection," Musical Quarterly 78 (1994): 9-33.
 Previn, Charles. "Schillinger's Influence on Film Music," Music News 39/3 (1947): 39-40.
 Quist, Ned. "Toward a Reconstruction of the Legacy of Joseph Schillinger" MLA Notes 58/4 (June 2002): 765-786.
 Rosar, William H. "Letter to the Editor," Musical Quarterly 80 (1996): 182-184. [response and amplification to Nauert's article]
 Sadie, Stanley; Hitchcock, H. Wiley (Ed.). The New Grove Dictionary of American Music. Grove's Dictionaries of Music, 1986.
 Schillinger, J.; The Schillinger System of Musical Composition (two volumes.); Rose Books 2005; 
 Schillinger, Frances. Joseph Schillinger: a Memoir.  New York: Greenberg, 1949 (Reprint: New York: Da Capo Press, 1976)
 Shaw, Arnold. "What is the Schillinger System?", Music News, 39/3 (1947): 37-38.
 Sitsky, Larry. Music of the repressed Russian avant-garde, 1900–1929. Westport: Greenwood Press, 1994.
 Slonimsky, Nicholas. "Schillinger of Russia and the World," Music News 39/3 (1947): 3-4.
 Smith, Charles Samuel. "An Analysis of Selected Mathematical Aspects of Schillinger's Approach to Music," M.A. Thesis, University of Iowa, 1951.
 Solomon, Seymour.  "Schillinger and 20th Century Rationalist Trends in Music,"  Music Forum and Digest (Jan., 1950): 4-5
 Vaglio, Anthony. "The Compositional Significance of Joseph Schillinger's System of Musical Composition as Reflected in the Works of Edwin Gerschefski," Ph.D., diss. University of Rochester, Eastman School of Music, 1977.
 Weissberg, David Jeffrey.  "Fractals and Music" Ph.D. dissertation, Rutgers University, 2000.
 Review of "Music from the Ether: Original Works for Theremin", American Music, 22/1 (Spring 2004): [192]-197.

External links
Joseph Schillinger Papers, 1918-2000 Music Division, New York Public Library for the Performing Arts.
 The Joseph Schillinger Papers from The Museum of Modern Art

1895 births
1943 deaths
Musicians from Kharkiv
People from Kharkov Governorate
Ukrainian Jews
Soviet emigrants to the United States
American people of Ukrainian-Jewish descent
American male classical composers
American classical composers
American music theorists
Jewish musicologists
Jewish classical musicians
Jewish American classical composers
Deaths from lung cancer in New York (state)
20th-century classical composers
20th-century American composers
20th-century American musicologists
20th-century American male musicians
Jewish Ukrainian musicians
20th-century American Jews